The Edmonton Storm are one of three Alberta-based women's tackle football teams in the Western Women's Canadian Football League, competing in the league's Western Conference. The Storm play competitive, full-contact tackle football under the Canadian Amateur football rules provided by Football Canada.
Prior to the formation of the WWCFL, the Storm competed in the Western Canadian Female Football League, capturing the league title in 2010.
Founded in 2004, the Storm competed in the inaugural WWCFL championship game. Their provincial rivals are the Calgary Rage and the Lethbridge Steel. The current head coach is Eric Theroux.

Year by year

IFAF competitors
The following recognizes women from the Edmonton Storm that competed in the IFAF Women's World Football Championships

2010
Shirley Benson, Offensive Line
 Lindsay Ertman, Wide Receiver
 Christina Goulet, Linebacker
 Karin 'Kiki' Simmons, Quarterback
 Terry Yahnke, Defensive Back

References

External links

Canadian football teams in Edmonton
Sport in Western Canada
Women's sports in Canada
2004 establishments in Alberta
Sports clubs established in 2004
Women in Alberta